Joel Adams (1750–1830) was an American planter and soldier.

Joel Adams may also refer to:

 Joel Adams II (1784–1859), American politician, lawyer, and planter
 Joel Adams (singer) (born 1996), Australian singer

See also 

 Adams (surname)
 Joel Adamson (born 1971), American baseball pitcher